Sunset in Vienna is a 1937 British musical drama film directed by Norman Walker and starring Tullio Carminati, Lilli Palmer and John Garrick.

It was made at Pinewood Studios.

A shortened version of the film was released in the United States in 1940 and this year and running time are sometimes listed.

Premise
An Italian officer marries an Austrian, but the outbreak of the First World War devastates their relationship.

Cast
 Tullio Carminati as Capt. Antonio 'Toni' Baretti
 Lilli Palmer as Gelda Sponek
 John Garrick as Lt. Adolphe Sponek
 Geraldine Hislop as Wanda
 Davina Craig as Deaf lady
 Hubert Harben as Austrian general
 Edgar Driver as Alfred
 Alice O'Day as Maddalena
 Eileen Munro as Superintendent of V.A.D.
 Patrick Barr as Ludwig  
 Peter Bull as Turk Outside Café  
 Katie Johnson as Woman in Café 
 Andreas Malandrinos as Café Manager 
 Julian Vedey as Candiani

References

Bibliography
 Bergfelder, Tim & Cargnelli, Christian. Destination London: German-speaking emigrés and British cinema, 1925-1950. Berghahn Books, 2008.
 Low, Rachael. Filmmaking in 1930s Britain. George Allen & Unwin, 1985.
 Wood, Linda. British Films, 1927-1939. British Film Institute, 1986.

External links

1937 films
1930s musical drama films
British musical drama films
1930s English-language films
Films directed by Norman Walker
Films shot at Pinewood Studios
Films set in the 1910s
Films set in Italy
British World War I films
British black-and-white films
1937 drama films
1930s British films